Sekondi-Takoradi Metropolitan Authority is a former district council that was located in Western Region, Ghana. Originally created as an district council in 1975. However on 1988, it was split off into two new district assemblies: Shama Ahanta East Metropolitan District (capital: Sekondi-Takoradi) and Ahanta West District (capital: Agona Nkwanta). The district council was located in the southeast part of Western Region and had Sekondi-Takoradi as its capital town.

References

Districts of the Western Region (Ghana)